Through the years, many secret societies, senior societies and other groups have been founded at Johns Hopkins. They are similar to the societies found at peer institutions, similar to an Eating club or Final club. The dominance of Greek letter societies prevented most of these societies from acquiring the same amount of property or prominence on campus. Most of these societies were founded at the beginning of the university and played a significant role in the early development of the student body. Almost all of the societies presented below are either defunct or non-existent. Because of their age, most of the records associated with them have been lost, giving an incomplete picture. Current members of the university community can recall little, if anything, about them. In fact, The Johns Hopkins News-Letter published an article citing the lack of any secret societies at the university, although the archives indicate the existence of several.

Remaining records about these organizations are mostly from the Hullabaloo (yearbook), the Alumni Magazine and donations from alumni to the university special collections and archives. Neither the table below, nor the article, are a complete list; many organizations are briefly mentioned in the archives, but not enough information has been found to be included.

The Cane Club

The Cane Club are an elite secret society that once met in Baltimore's speakeasies during Prohibition for "the gentlemanly indulgence of forbidden beverages," and is now believed to meet at the Temple of the Scottish Rite near Homewood Campus.  Founded in the early 1920s, "The Canes" were founded as a "Junior-Senior Honor Society." In public initiations known as "knightings," new members would be struck with canes. They are noted for an annual parade in which members walk through the campus wearing flowers. The Canes recruit academically talented students and top achieving athletes, a number of whom are known to have served on the Student Council. One of the few public records that exists describes a mandate to uphold an "atmosphere of gentility of bygone days." The Cane Club is active.

One prominent member was Alger Hiss, who at Johns Hopkins was voted most popular student and elected Student Council president in 1926. His distinguished career as a statesman ended when he was accused by Senator Joseph McCarthy of disloyalty to the United States. Another prominent member of Baltimore society was Charles A. Conklin III, founder, president and chairman emeritus of Lyon-Conklin and Co. Inc.

The Roughnecks

The Roughnecks were a group of sophomores from the Undergraduate Student Council, including their president, which oversaw "Class Day" which was a hazing event for new freshmen. Class Day, or Hell Day as it was often referred to in the Hullabaloo, was an annual event when sophomores would troll around all day physically abusing unsuspecting freshmen. When it started in the early 1900s, it was more violent, with freshmen sustaining actual injuries. It eventually grew into something far more tame as the administration began to frown upon actual hazing. By the late 1960s, Class Day had become a tug-of-war between the classes. Today, it has been renamed "The Class Clash" and consists of a volleyball game.

The second primary task of the Roughnecks was to crash the Freshmen Banquet. The freshman President was tasked annually, when elected in the fall, to organize a secret dinner for all of the freshmen by the end of the second semester. The Roughnecks was to organize the sophomores in an effort to crash the dinner. These instances often got violent and lead to civil punishment. Things came to a head on April 23, 1923, when the sophomore class crashes the Freshmen Banquet and subsequent rioting lead to the arrest of four sophomores. Another instance occurred on March 22, 1927, where the Roughnecks again stormed the Freshmen Banquet at the National Guard Armory in Annapolis. Police and fire departments arrive and ten students are jailed on charges of destroying state property, malicious mischief, and rioting; four are taken to the hospital. The melee causes three thousand dollars in property damage in armory. Pressured from the administration, the Student Council passes a rule that fighting is not allowed from two hours before a banquet until an hour after. Shortly thereafter, the Roughnecks were forced out of existence.

The Ubiquiteers

The Ubiquiteers was a social club founded at the Johns Hopkins Bloomberg School of Public Health in 1921 by James Shirley Sweeney to encourage increased student interaction among the diverse student body. Sweeney first brought the idea of the club to the attention of prominent Johns Hopkins administration at a formal dinner held by the Rockefeller Foundation for its fellows at the School. William H. Welch, the director of the school of Public Health, warmly embraced the idea.

The club would meet for weekly drinks, allowing students of various backgrounds to interact with each other and provide an opportunity to share knowledge. The Ubiquiteers' name (which Howell referred to as that "pleasing addition to our thesaurus verborum") can be traced to Thomas John LeBlanc, ScD '24, the club's third president. As the Ubiquiteers' first yearbook makes clear, the etymology of Ubiquiteers "suggests rarities from all ends of the earth."Their mission, as Sweeney later described it, was to "cultivate useful friendships, to broaden and develop minds; and to always stand ready to serve its members who might be in distant lands."

By its second year, the Ubiquiteers doubled their membership to 62 students from 23 countries. Founding members met incoming students at the railroad stations and helped them find living quarters. They scheduled regular dinners, tea parties, picnics, and smokers (informal social gatherings). Often a student would present a talk about his or her country and "its government, its people, religious and social customs, public health activities, et cetera," noted Sweeney, who eschewed formality and was proud that the club ran itself without the "frills of a constitution with the trimmings of by-laws." Through the years Ubiquiteers meetings mixed seminars on scientific subjects  with dances, piano recitals, sing-alongs, group daytrips, and dinners with an assortment of ethnic foods.

The club's prevalence and membership varied throughout the years, dwindling during the Great Depression and World War II. During the height of the Great Depression, 22 students ponied up 15 or 25 cents each for dues in 1931, boosting the treasury to $4.15. Treasurer Robert Dyar parodied the perpetually dire state of the Ubiquiteers bankroll in 1937 when he wrote, "Our $.07 (seven cents) we bequeath to our successors, the class of '38, and trust that they may have as much pleasure from it, as we have had from the products of and additions to our original dowry of 1¢, so generously preserved for us by our predecessors."

With the repeal of Prohibition in 1933, membership rose along with their finances. Although World War II dropped their ranks further, the post war years were very good for the club. Their reputation grew and student & faculty from different parts of the university began to join the club and attend their functions, including Abel Wolman.

Despite its four decades of tradition, the Ubiquiteers wouldn't survive the 1960s. The availability of other social outlets obviated the need for a general student club. With the students' social life filled by Friday Happy Hours, international dinners, and the Student Assembly, the Ubiquiteers as a formal organization faded away. At some point, the club's annual rebirth just didn't occur. No records of the Ubiquiteers exist in the archives after 1966.

The Pithotomy Club

Founding and early history

The Pithotomy club was a medical student club formed by the first senior class in 1897. The original intention of the club was to foster a sense of brotherhood among the students and also to encourage informal interactions between the faculty and students. It started when William G. MacCallum and Joseph L. Nichols had rented a house at 1200 Guilford Avenue and as a housewarming celebration invited Drs. William H. Welch and William Osler, other faculty members, and friends to the house and entertained them with a keg of beer. These gatherings were repeated several times and finally several classmates joined MacCallum and Nichols to organize what became known as the Pithotomy Club. The word "Pithotomy" was invented by MacCallum when he combined the Greek words pithos, meaning vessel, and otomos, meaning to open. Together the words mean, to Pithotomists at least, "to tap a keg." The club's constitution, written in 1897, states its mission in this manner: "the promotion of vice among the virtuous, virtue among the vicious, and good fellowship among all."

The pithotomy show

The decade of the turn of the century saw the advent of the Pithotomy Show, an annual event put on by the Pithotomists as they  vented four years of frustration toward the faculty while retaining their affection for individual faculty members. For the faculty, the show provided more than a chance to "see ourselves as others see us" by allowing them to spend an informal evening with their colleagues, drink a little too much, sing a little too loudly, and relive what for some professors was decades of show attendance. The show often contained offensive material and was generally regarded as a bit raunchy. The show would eventually lead to the club's demise over a century later.

The beer slide

As the club became older, it became infamous for its vice. Members often engaged in illicit drinking activities during Prohibition and illegal gambling. Neighbors often complained on the incessant partying and noise. The beer slide was one of the most infamous aspects of the club which occurred immediately after the Pithotomy show. The floor was generally covered in beer and members were sent sliding around on the floor. Alumni often recall humorous anecdotes about the beer slide gone wrong.

The final years and legacy

Although the club was best known for its debauchery, it still produced some of JHU's most accomplished doctors. George Hoyt Whipple was a Pithotomist who graduated in 1905 was awarded the Nobel Prize in medicine in 1934. Because membership was typically restricted to the upper tiers of third and fourth year medical students, the club also ironically functioned as an honor society. Many Pithotomists went to have successful medical careers.

In 1980 the Club began a new activity, or more accurately, revived an old one, the Turtle Derby. The Turtle Derby was first held in 1931 at the Johns Hopkins Hospital when Colonel Frisby, the hospital doorman, kept a number of box turtles in what was called Frisby Farms. The idea occurred to race the turtles, and the Turtle Derby came into being. The house staff assumed sponsorship and the Derby became an increasingly extravagant affair and fund-raiser for Baltimore charities. Unfortunately, house staff apathy killed the Derby in 1977. In September 1979, while dining at the Club, Dr. Henry Siedel, Associate Dean of Student Affairs, suggested that the Pithotomy Club revive the once-popular Derby. The Club undertook the project with much enthusiasm. The Pithotomy Club sponsored Turtle Derby, with the financial backing from the Hospital and School of Medicine, was held on May 16, 1980. Led by Co-chairmen Gary Firestein ('80) and Charles Flexner ('82), the Derby was highly successful. Over one hundred turtles entered races and the Pithotomists sold over three hundred T-shirts and countless buttons. It provided entertainment for the hospital staff and many children from the Children's Medical and Surgical Center and raised money for good causes. The Turtle Derby, which is still going strong, can thus be added to the list of successful Pitotomy Club activities. It still continues to this day.

The beginning of the end came in 1982, when the Pithotomists depicted Dr. Bernadine Healy in a very offensive role. Dr. Healy was highly offended by her portrayal in the show and demanded that the Club be punished and threatened a large lawsuit. Although she left the school soon after, the reputation of the club quickly fell. That show and the club continue to be an example of sexual harassment in medical schools in many publications. The club also lost its house and had to move to less ideal locations, which prevented the day to day interactions which had been pivotal to the club's existence. Coupled with the scandal, the club finally closed its doors in 1992.

Gamma Alpha Pi
Gamma Alpha Phi was a Masonic secret society founded at Homewood in 1921. The society never sought nor had representation on the Inter-Fraternity council. It awarded special awards in the form of keys to undergraduates for outstanding Masonic Research which the society published in the Grand Chapter Minutes. The society eventually grew to found chapters at the University of Maryland, George Washington University and Vanderbilt University. The society is thought to be defunct at the present time, but that is unconfirmed.

The Ananias Society

The Ananias Society was a secret society established in the early years of the University. The first mention of the society in the first yearbook published in 1889 under the name "Debutante" (which later becomes the Hullabaloo in 1894). The Society's motto is "Let fa (w) ncy Unmolested Reign" and their colors were similar to the University's colors of Sable & Gold. They referred to their members as either "Lyres Attuned" for initiated members and "Liars Out of Tune" for pledging members. Like most societies of their day, they primarily only publicly referred to their members by their nicknames. The pledging class of 1892 consisted of "The Scorpion", "The Baron", "Julep", "Amelia" and "Sam". The officers of the Society also had strange titles. They continue to be referenced in university publications until for several years, but there is no mention of the Society in neither the Alumni Magazine nor the Hullabaloo soon after.

The Senior Society
The Senior Society was another upperclassmen secret society which was founded in 1892. As the name implies, membership was restricted to only eleven newly tapped seniors who revealed themselves at the end of the spring semester. Their exact purpose was unknown, but similar to most senior societies, membership was based on loyalty to the university, academics and prevalence on campus. Their actual name is thought to be known only to members and incorporate the Greek letters " Delta". Their crest, which consists of a rooster and twelve stars appears in other photos and texts in the University Archives. Their motto is οἱ πολλοί (Hoi Polloi), which roughly translates to "The Masses". The phrase became known to English scholars probably from Pericles' Funeral Oration, as mentioned in Thucydides' History of the Peloponnesian War. Pericles uses it in a positive way when praising the Athenian democracy, contrasting it with hoi oligoi, or oligarchy. During this time, many student groups tended to embrace similar philosophies and were against the centralization of power in the Student Council. Their current existence is speculated, but unconfirmed.

Other Societies

The archives contain the history of other secret and senior societies. The most prevalent are  The Eta Pi Society, De Gang and the Sigma Tau  Club.

The Eta Pi Society was an Epicurean society founded at the turn of the century. References can be found in the Hullabaloo and the Alumni Magazine. Members were typically a small number of seniors selected each year. They were known to give beer and pies to new initiates and to certain members of the faculty and administration.

Archives indicate that members, like many of the senior societies, referred to themselves through nicknames. Yearbook pages show that the society was founded by "Little Jack Horner". They remained as an alternative to Greek Life while encouraging drinking and merriment among the student body. Known to be rowdy at social events, they were the main driving force in organizing class dinners and other university social events. They expanded their influence by often recruiting members of student council and other prominent students. They lost much of their influence during the Red Scare, when many secret societies were closed down. They continued to be a part of the university publicly for several decades, until they either stop holding meetings or voluntarily removed themselves from the public eye. The president of the society, generally only referred to by strange nicknames, wore a pin with the initials "ES" below a Flemish Lion, the symbol of the Society, on graduation day.

De Gang & the Sigma Tau  Club were senior societies founded in the 1890s. Little is known about De Gang other than its membership rosters. It was founded in 1891. The Sigma Tau  Club (STK) was another senior society which was around for a period of twenty years or so. Membership rosters and meeting notes are found in the archives. STK consisted of members who either did not receive bids or did not want to join the Greek letter fraternities at the time.

See also
 Collegiate secret societies in North America
 Johns Hopkins
 Prohibition in the United States
 Secret society

References

Johns Hopkins University
Collegiate secret societies
Student societies in the United States
Johns Hopkins (defunct)\